Zoosystema is a peer-reviewed scientific journal published by the National Museum of Natural History, France (Muséum national d'histoire naturelle), covering research in animal biodiversity. Specific subjects within the journal's scope include comparative, functional and evolutionary morphology, phylogeny, biogeography, taxonomy and nomenclature, among others. Zoosystema publishes articles in English and French.

Indexing
The journal is abstracted and indexed by Current Contents, Biological Abstracts, ASFA (Aquatic Sciences and Fisheries Abstracts), Pascal, Zoological Record, Journal Citation Index Expanded (SciSearch®) and Scopus.

References

Zoology journals
Animal science journals
Open access journals
Academic journals published in France